This article is a list of fatal accidents involving commercial cargo aircraft and is grouped by the years in which the accidents and incidents occurred.

1947
16 June An Aeroflot Lisunov Li-2 (CCCP-L4088) crashes on takeoff from Leninabad Airport after failing to gain altitude due to overloading, killing three of seven on board.

1949
29 January An Aeroflot Lisunov Li-2 (CCCP-L4491) stalls and crashes on takeoff from Nizhnaya Pesha Airport, Russia due to load shifting, killing three of four on board.

1951
27 March An Air Transport Charter Douglas Dakota 3 crashes shortly after takeoff from Ringway Airport en route to Nutts Corner Airport, killing four of six on board.

1955
24 September Flying Tiger Line Flight 7413-23, a Douglas C-54A (N90433), ditched 1000 mi off Honolulu, Hawaii due to triple engine failure and crew error, killing three of five crew.

1956
13 February: A Maritime Central Airways Bristol Freighter 31 (CF-FZU) crashes on climbout from Frobisher Bay Airport, Canada due to load shifting, killing all three crew.

1958
25 May A Dan-Air Avro 685 York C.1 crashed at Gurgaon, India due to an in-flight fire caused by engine failure, killing four of five on board.
2 September An Independent Air Travel Vickers VC.1 Viking crashed near Southall, Middlesex due to pilot error following engine failure, killing all three crew on board and four people on the ground.
9 September A Flying Tiger Line Lockheed L-1049H Super Constellation (N6920C), struck Mount Ōyama near Tokyo, Japan, killing all eight on board.

1959
23 April An Air Charter Avro Super Trader IV crashed on Mount Süphan, Turkey, killing all 12 crew on board.

1961
21 July Alaska Airlines Flight 779 crashes on approach to Sheyma Airport, killing all six crew members on board.

1962
15 March Flying Tiger Line Flight 7816, a Lockheed L-1049H Super Constellation, crashed at Adak Island Naval Air Station, Alaska due to pilot error, killing one of seven crew.
14 December Flying Tiger Line Flight 183, a Lockheed L-1049H Super Constellation, crashed near Lockheed Air Terminal due to pilot incapacitation, killing all five crew on board and three on the ground.

1964
24 December Flying Tiger Line Flight 282, a Lockheed L-1049H Super Constellation, struck the top of Sweeney Ridge in San Bruno, California after an unexplained course change, killing the three crew.

1965
15 December Flying Tiger Line Flight 914, a Lockheed L-1049H Super Constellation, struck California Peak due to spatial disorientation, killing the three crew.

1966
24 December A Flying Tiger Line Canadair CL-44D4-1 (N228SW) crashed short of the runway at Da Nang Airport, killing all four crew on board and 107 on the ground.

1967
6 January A Channel Air Lift Curtiss C-46F (N30046) stalls and crashes at Hilo International Airport, Hawaii while attempting an emergency landing after the load shifted to the rear, killing the three crew.

1968
26 December Pan Am Flight 799, a Boeing 707-321C crashes shortly after takeoff due to improper flap configuration, killing all three crew.

1970
27 July Flying Tiger Line Flight 45, a Douglas DC-8-63AF (N785FT), crashes off of Naha Air Force Base due to excessive descent, killing the four crew.

1976
4 February A Líneas Aéreas del Caribe Douglas DC-6 (HK-1389) crashed into the sea at Santa Marta, Colombia on a flight to Curaçao, three killed.

27 August An Aeronaves del Perú Canadair CL-44 (OB-R-1104) went missing on a flight between from Lima, Peru to Maiquetía, Venezuela, six crew presumed killed.

16 September An Aerosucre Colombia Curtiss C-46 (HK-1282) went missing over the Caribbean on a flight to Aruba, two crew presumed killed.

27 December A Transportes Aereos Itinez Fairchild Packet (CP-983) destroyed on take-off at San Ramón, Bolivia, two crew and two passengers killed.

1977
13 January JAL Cargo Flight 8054, a Japan Air Lines Douglas DC-8 (JA8054) destroyed shortly after take-off at Anchorage, Alaska, United States, two crew and two cargo handlers killed.

31 January A TransNorthern Aviation Chase C-122 (N5904V) was destroyed on take-off from Anchorage, Alaska, one crew killed and two others seriously injured.

11 February A CSA Ilyushin Il-14 (OK-OCA) was destroyed on approach near Bratislava, Czechoslovakia when it hit trees  short of the runway, two crew and two passengers killed, one crew seriously injured.

4 March An Overseas National Airways Douglas DC-8 (N8635) was destroyed on landing at Niamey, Niger, two killed and two seriously injured.

28 March An Emery Worldwide Douglas C-47A, N57131, was destroyed by fire following a taxiing accident at O'Hare International Airport, Chicago, Illinois. The aircraft was due to operate a cargo flight.

2 April An Aviogenex Tupolev Tu-134A (YU-AJS) crashed on landing at Libreville, Gabon, six crew and two passengers killed.

13 May A LOT Antonov An-12 (SP-LZA) crashed near Aramoun, Lebanon on approach to Beirut International Airport; the crew of nine were killed.

14 May A Dan Air Boeing 707 (G-BEBP) crashed near Lusaka, Zambia, on approach after the horizontal stabiliser and elevator failed, five crew and one passenger killed.

30 June A Cooperativa de Montecillos Lockheed L-188 Electra (N126US) went missing on a flight between San José, Costa Rica and Maiquetía, Venezuela, three crew and one passenger presumed killed.

6 July A Fleming International Airways Lockheed L-188 Electra (N280F) crashed on take-off at St Louis, Missouri, United States, three crew killed.

20 July An Ethiopian Airlines Douglas DC-3 (ET-ABF) flying from Tippi Airport, (TIE/HATP), to Jimma Airport, (JIM/HAJM), crashed into a mountain in bad weather at Tubo Milkie, Ethiopia, three crew and two passengers killed.

20 August A Monarch Aviation Convair CV-880-22-2 (N8817E) crashed on departure from Juan Santamaría International Airport, San José, Costa Rica (SJO/MROC). The three crew were killed when the aircraft struck trees 2 minutes and 20 seconds after take-of, due to being overloaded.

25 August An Island Airways Short Skyvan (N4917) crashed and burned  from the runway at Kona International Airport, Hawaii, two crew killed.

2 September A Transmeridian Air Cargo Canadair CL-44 (G-ATZH) crashed near Waglan Island, Hong Kong following engine failure on take-off, four crew killed.

12 September A Safe Air Cargo Douglas DC-7BF (N6314J) crashed on take-off at Yakutat, Alaska, United States, four crew killed.

30 September An Aviateca Douglas DC-3 (TG-AKA) crashed on landing at Mundo Maya International Airport, Flores, El Petén, Guatemala, of the three crew on board one was killed and one seriously injured.

19 November An Ethiopian Airlines Boeing 707 (ET-ACD) was destroyed when it hit trees on departure from Rome, Italy, three crew and two passengers killed.

20 November A Norcanair Bristol 170 (C-FWAD) stalled on take-off at Hay River, Northwest Territories after the load shifted, one killed and one seriously injured.

18 December United Airlines Flight 2860, a Douglas DC-8-54AF crashed into the mountains near Kaysville, Utah, United States, three crew killed.

1978
28 February A Talair DHC-6 Twin Otter (P2-TGT) crashed on approach to Garaina Airport, Garaina, Papua New Guinea, one killed.

14 August An Aeropesca Colombia Curtiss C-46 Commando (HK-1350C) crashed in bad weather, with no navigation equipment, near Tota, Boyacá, Colombia.

27 August After take-off from Muscat International Airport, A'Seeb, (MCT/OOMS), a New World Air Charters Douglas DC-6 (N122A) crashed into Jabel Hameem near Muscat, Oman, four crew killed.

1979
30 January A Varig Boeing 707-320C disappeared on a flight from Tokyo, Japan to Rio de Janeiro, Brazil, five crew missing presumed killed.

26 March An Interflug Ilyushin Il-18D (DM-STL) destroyed by fire following engine failure on take-off from Luanda-4 de Fevereiro Airport, Luanda, Angola, four crew and six passengers killed.

25 May A Sea Airmotive de Havilland Canada DHC-4A Caribou (N581PA) stalled during a crosswind turn and destroyed at Bullen Point, Alaska, United States; the three crew were killed.

26 July Lufthansa Flight 527, a Boeing 707-330C (D-ABUY), operating a cargo service from Rio de Janeiro to Frankfurt via Dakar, collided with a mountain 5 minutes after take-off from Galeão. The crew of 3 died.

28 September A Transportes Aéreos Bolivianos Lockheed Hercules (CP-1375) crashed on take-off at Tocumen International Airport, Panama, four crew killed.

18 November Transamerica Airlines Flight 18, a Lockheed L-188CF Electra (N859U), departed Hill AFB for an IFR cargo flight to Nellis AFB, disintegrated in flight near Salt Lake City, Utah, United States following electrical failure, three crew killed.

1980
16 February A Redcoat Air Cargo Bristol 175 Britannia 253 (G-BRAC), en route from Belize International Airport to RAF Brize Norton crashed after take-off at Billerica, Massachusetts, United States, due to intake icing; four crew and three passengers killed and one crew member seriously injured.

1 August An Aeronaves del Perú Douglas DC-8 (OB-R-1143) crashed into a mountain on approach to Mexico City, Mexico in fog, three of the seven crew killed.

23 August A Transamerica Airlines Lockheed L-100-30 Hercules (N18ST), en route from Panama City–Bay County International Airport, FL (PFN/KPFN) to San Diego, collided with and killed a parachutist near Otay, California, United States. All five people involved were killed.

10 September An Aerovias del Norte Llota Douglas DC-3 (HK-329) went missing in bad weather, wreckage later found at Puerto Olaya, Colombia, three crew killed.

1982
18 September Aeroservicios Ecuatorianos Flight 767-103, a Douglas DC-8-55F, failed to take off at Quito Airport, Ecuador, killing four crew and 49 on the ground.

1983
11 January United Airlines Flight 2885, a Douglas DC-8-54F, crashed shortly after takeoff from Detroit Metropolitan Wayne County Airport due to pilot error and aircraft upset, killing the three crew.

1987
30 July A Belize Air International Boeing C-97 Stratofreighter crashes on Mexican Federal Highway 15 shortly after takeoff from Mexico City, killing five of 12 on board and 44 on the ground. The aircraft was transporting 18 horses to Florida; the horses panicked and ran around in the cargo compartment, causing the center of gravity to shift too far to the rear.

1989
19 February Flying Tiger Line Flight 66, a Boeing 747-200F, crashed near Subang International Airport due to ATC and crew errors, killing the four crew.

21 March Transbrasil Flight 801, a Boeing 707, stalled after a crew member mistakenly applied the brakes and crashed into a slum in Sao Paulo, killing all three crew members on board, and 22 others on the ground.

27 November A Tepper Aviation (but flying on behalf of the CIA) Lockheed L-100 Hercules crashes on approach to Jamba, Angola for reasons unknown, killing all five on board.

1991
29 December China Airlines Flight 358, a Boeing 747-200F, struck a hill near Wanli, Taiwan after both right side engines separated, killing the five crew.

1992
4 October El Al Flight 1862, a Boeing 747-200F, crashed into an apartment complex in Amsterdam after both right side engines separated, killing all 4 people on board the plane as well as 39 people on the ground.

1994
24 February Pulkovo Aviation Enterprise Flight 9045, an Antonov An-12, crashed on approach to Nalchik while carrying 12,515 kg of coins from the Saint Petersburg Mint.

1996
19 August Spair Airlines Flight 3601, an Ilyushin Il-76T, crashed while attempting to land at Belgrade Nikola Tesla Airport after an electrical failure, killing the 12 crew.

9 December An Emery Worldwide, a Douglas C-47A, N75142, crashed on approach to Boise Airport killing both crew. The aircraft was on a cargo flight to Salt Lake City International Airport when the starboard engine caught fire shortly after take-off and the decision was made to return to Boise.

1997
7 August Fine Air Flight 101, a DC-8-61F registration N27UA, crashed on departure from Miami International Airport onto NW 72nd Avenue less than a mile (1.6 km) from the airport. The freight pallets were improperly secured and shifted during takeoff, causing the aircraft to stall.

1999
15 April Korean Air Cargo Flight 6316, a McDonnell Douglas MD-11F, crashed shortly after takeoff from Shanghai Hongqiao International Airport due to pilot error, killing the three crew and 5 people on the ground.
22 December Korean Air Cargo Flight 8509, a Boeing 747-200F, crashed shortly after takeoff from London Stansted Airport due to instrument malfunction and pilot error, killing the four crew.

2000

16 February Emery Worldwide Flight 17, a McDonnell Douglas DC-8-71F crashes into an automobile salvage yard shortly after taking off from Sacramento Mather Airport on a flight to Dayton, Ohio, killing all 3 crew members on board. The cause of the crash was a disconnection of the right elevator control tab.

2002
1 July DHL Flight 611, a Boeing 757-200F, collided in mid-air with a Bashkirian Airlines Tupolev Tu-154 over Überlingen, Germany, killing the two pilots in the DHL plane and all 69 people in the Bashkirian Airlines plane.

2004
14 October MK Airlines Flight 1602, a Boeing 747-200F, crashed on takeoff from Halifax Stanfield International Airport due to pilot error, killing the seven crew.

2009
23 March FedEx Express Flight 80, a McDonnell Douglas MD-11F, crashed on landing at Narita International Airport due to pilot error, killing the two pilots.
21 October Azza Transport Flight 2241, a Boeing 707-330C, crashed on takeoff from Sharjah International Airport due to loss of control caused by crew errors, killing the six crew.
28 November Avient Aviation Flight 324, a McDonnell Douglas MD-11F, crash on takeoff from Shanghai Pudong International Airport, killing three of the seven crew.

2010
13 April AeroUnion Flight 302, an Airbus A300B4-200F, crashed in Monterrey while attempting to land in poor weather, killing the five crew members and two people on the ground.
3 September UPS Airlines Flight 6, a Boeing 747-400F, crashed near Dubai while attempting to land after the crew reported a cargo fire, killing the two pilots.
28 November Sun Way Flight 4412, an Ilyushin Il-76TD, crashed at Karachi, Pakistan while attempting an emergency landing after an engine caught fire, killing the eight crew on board and four on the ground.

2011
6 July A Silk Way Airlines Ilyushin Il-76 crashed near Bagram Air Base, killing the nine crew; the aircraft was probably shot down.
28 July Asiana Airlines Flight 991, a Boeing 747-400F, crashed off Jeju Island, South Korea after the crew reported a fire in the cargo compartment, killing the two pilots.
9 August An Avis Amur Antonov An-12 crashed at Omsukchan, Russia due to loss of control following an engine fire, killing all 11 passengers and crew on board.

2013
29 April National Airlines Flight 102, a Boeing 747-400BCF, stalled and crashed just after takeoff from Bagram Airfield, after the cargo broke loose, killing the seven crew.
14 August UPS Airlines Flight 1354, an Airbus A300F4-600R, crashed short of the runway at Birmingham–Shuttlesworth International Airport, killing the two pilots.

2019 
23 February Atlas Air Flight 3591, a Boeing 767-300BCF, entered a nosedive and crashed in Trinity Bay near Anahuac, Texas en route to Houston from Miami due to loss of control following crew errors; all 3 crew were killed. The aircraft was operating for Atlas Air on behalf of Amazon Prime Air.
4 October Ukraine Air Alliance Flight 4050, an Antonov An-12, crashes short of the runway at Lviv due to fuel exhaustion, killing five of eight on board.

References

Bibliography

commercial cargo aircraft
Airline-related lists
+Cargo aircraft